Jim Deane (2 January 1928 – 13 November 2010) was an Australian rules footballer who played with Richmond in the Victorian Football League (VFL) and South Adelaide in the South Australian National Football League (SANFL). 

A half forward flanker, Deane is one of only two South Adelaide players to have won dual Magarey Medals. He won the first in 1953 and the second in 1957, although the latter was not awarded until 1998 when the league decided to give players who lost on a countback over the years their Medal retrospectively. Deane also won six best and fairest awards for South Adelaide and represented South Australia at interstate football on 15 occasions.

Deane coached Myrtleford in the Ovens and Murray Football League from 1958 to 1962. He won the league's Morris Medal in 1958 and 1961.

In 1970 and 1971 he was non-playing coach of South Adelaide.

Deane died in Balaklava, South Australia on 13 November 2010.

References

External links 

Australian rules footballers from South Australia
Richmond Football Club players
South Adelaide Football Club players
South Adelaide Football Club coaches
Magarey Medal winners
Myrtleford Football Club players
South Australian Football Hall of Fame inductees
1928 births
2010 deaths
People from Balaklava, South Australia
Australian Football Hall of Fame inductees